Quinnell is a surname. Notable people with the name include:
Craig Quinnell (born 1975), Welsh rugby union player
Derek Quinnell (born 1949), Welsh rugby union player
Gavin Quinnell  (born 1983), Welsh rugby union player
Ken Quinnell (born 1939), Australian screenwriter and director
Scott Quinnell (born 1972), Welsh rugby league and rugby union player
Pen name
A. J. Quinnell, a pen name of the English thriller novelist Philip Nicholson

See also
Quennell
Quenelle